The Tata Venture is a 3/4-door, 5- to 8-seater cabover full-size minivan (MPV) unveiled on 5 January 2010 at the 10th AutoExpo in Pragati Maidan by Tata Motors in India. It is in competition with the prevalent minivans and vans from Maruti, Mahindra, Toyota, Chevrolet and Force Motors. Venture is powered by a 1.4-litre turbo diesel engine delivering  power, it is available in 5-, 6-, 7- and 8-seater arrangement. It comes with features such as dual heating, ventilation and air-conditioning (HVAC), reverse parking sensor, power windows, keyless entry and power steering.

Tata Venture in India
On 6 January 2011, Tata Motors launched its awaited passenger vehicle Tata Venture in the Indian automobile market. In India, Tata Venture is available in three variants and all of its variants are equipped with 1.4-litre, 1405 cc Turbocharged diesel engine. The 1.4 L, Turbocharged diesel engine with 5-speed manual transmission gearbox delivers maximum power of 71 PS at 4500 rpm with 135 Nm of maximum torque at 2500 rpm. The all-new minivan Tata Venture is launched with a price tag of Rs 405,000 to Rs 507,000 (ex-showroom, Jaipur).

The Tata Venture is affixed with power steering and power windows, keyless entry, reverse parking aid along with engine immobiliser and the rear wipers too. The car comes in five-, six-, seven- and eight-seater options divided in three-row front-facing configuration. The new car comes in five bright colour options.

The new car Tata Venture is a minivan, it also has a cabover design, and can accommodate eight passengers easily. The minivan is loaded with 1.4-litre turbo diesel powertrain which offers excellent fuel efficiency among the ones available in the domestic auto market. The new minivan offers a mileage of 15.42 kmpl, certified by ARAI.Top speed is 125 km per/hr.

Tata Venture models in India

External links

 Tata Venture Official Website

2010s cars
Cab over vehicles
Cars introduced in 2010
Minivans
Rear-engined vehicles
Rear-wheel-drive vehicles
Venture